Arthur Leslie Bloom FCRP, FRCPath (1930–1992) was a Welsh physician focused on the field of Haemophilia.

He died at the age of 62 on Thursday 12 November 1992.

Positions
In the 1970s/1980's, he was Chairman of the Haemophilia Centre Directors Organisation.

Bloom served as Director of the Cardiff Haemophilia Centre and had held important positions with the World Federation of Haemophilia.

He was also a senior member of The Haemophilia Society's medical advisory panel and a member of the Central Blood Laboratories Authority (CBLA).

Controversy

Being centrally placed, Bloom was one of the key figures in what would become known as the Tainted Blood Scandal. Some of his actions were highlighted in The Penrose Inquiry.

In 2017 an episode of BBC Panorama alleged that Bloom had knowingly downplayed the risks of contracting HIV from Factor VIII blood products. In the following year the allegation was repeated in The Guardian.

Posthumous

The Arthur Bloom Haemophilia Centre which is a part of The University Hospital of Wales was named after him and provides services for people with haemophilia, HIV/AIDS, & hepatitis C and their families.

References

1930 births
1992 deaths
20th-century Welsh medical doctors
Fellows of the Royal College of Physicians
Fellows of the Royal College of Pathologists